PETO – Die junge Alternative (Shorter name: PETO, lat.: „I postulate“) is one of the first youth parties in Germany. Established in 1999, the political party is based in Monheim am Rhein in North Rhine-Westphalia.

2014 Town Council and Mayoral Elections - Monheim am Rhein 
PETO made overwhelming gains in the Town Council and Mayoral elections in 2014. Daniel Zimmermann (the incumbent mayor of Monheim) won with 94,64% of the vote, against Manfred Poell (Bundnis 90/Grüne - 5,36%). In the Town Council elections, PETO received 65,64% of the vote, compared with 17,80% for Angela Merkel's Christian Democrats (CDU/CSU).

See also 

 Monheim am Rhein
 List of political parties in Germany
 Jugend- und Entwicklungspartei Deutschlands

References

External links 
 Official website

Political parties in Germany
North Rhine-Westphalia